Ahmed Waseem Razeek (born 13 September 1994) is a professional footballer who currently plays as a right winger for Hong Kong First Division League club Eastern District. Born in Germany, he represents the Sri Lanka national team.

Club career

Early career
Razeek began playing football with NFC Rot-Weiß Neukölln, before moving to the youth program of Union Berlin via Tasmania Gropiusstadt and Tennis Borussia Berlin.

Union Berlin
He made his debut for Union Berlin II, who played in the Regionalliga Nordost, during the 2012–13 season. He finished the season with one goal in six matches. During the 2013–14 season, he split time between the first and second teams. For the reserve team, he again scored a goal in six matches. He signed a professional contract for the 2013–14 season and made his professional debut on 19 April 2014 when he was subbed in for Christopher Quiring in a 2. Bundesliga match against Karlsruher SC. This proved to be his only appearance for the first team as all of his appearances in the 2014–15 season was made with the second team. He finished the season with five goals in 21 appearances. This proved to be his last season with Union Berlin II. Union Berlin dissolved their second team.

1. FC Magdeburg
Razeek signed a two-year contract with newly promoted 3. Liga side 1. FC Magdeburg. He made his debut against Rot-Weiß Erfurt on 24 July 2015. He was sent–off against Hallescher FC on 16 August 2015 after receiving his second yellow card. He finished the 2015–16 season with two goals in 23 appearances. He then finished the 2016–17 season with two goals in 13 appearances.

Rot–Weiss Erfurt
He played for Rot–Weiss Erfurt during the 2017–18 season. He scored three goals in 30 appearances.

Berliner AK 07
Shortly before the 2019–20 season, Razeek joined Regionalliga Nordost club Berliner AK 07. During his one season at the club, he made 12 league appearances, scoring three goals.

Gokulam Kerala
On 24 March 2022, Razeek signed with I-League defending champions Gokulam Kerala.

Razeek scored on his debut for the club, on 9 April 2022, against Indian Arrows, which ended in a dominating 5–0 win. His team Gokulam Kerala clinched I-League title in 2021–22 season, defeating Mohammedan Sporting 2–1 in the final game at the Salt Lake Stadium on 14 May, and became the first club in fifteen years to defend the title.

Eastern District 
In January 2023, Razeek joined Hong Kong First Division League club Eastern District.

International career 
He made his senior national team debut on 19 November 2019, in an 2022 FIFA World Cup qualification match against Turkmenistan.

He scored a brace on 5 June 2021, in a 2022 FIFA World Cup qualification match against Lebanon.

Career statistics

Club

International

Honours 
Gokulam Kerala
 I-League: 2021–22

Individual
 2021 Four Nations Football Tournament top scorer (7 goals)

References

External links 
 
 
 

1994 births
Living people
Footballers from Berlin
German people of Sri Lankan descent
German footballers
Sri Lankan footballers
Association football midfielders
1. FC Union Berlin players
1. FC Magdeburg players
FC Rot-Weiß Erfurt players
Berliner AK 07 players
2. Bundesliga players
3. Liga players
Regionalliga players
Sri Lanka international footballers
Gokulam Kerala FC players
Sri Lankan expatriate footballers
Sri Lankan expatriate sportspeople in India
Expatriate footballers in India
I-League players
Expatriate footballers in Hong Kong
Hong Kong First Division League players